Zyxel Communications Corporation, a subsidiary of Unizyx Holding Corporation, is a Taiwanese multinational broadband provider headquartered in the Hsinchu Science Park, Taiwan. The company was founded in 1989 by Dr Shun-I Chu, and has three research centers, four regional headquarters, and 35 branch offices.

The company has a portfolio of mobile and fixed-line broadband access products. In 2020, Zyxel Communications launched WiFi 6 and 5G flagship products ahead of the competition and were adopted by leading Nordic service providers.

Corporate history
1988 – Zyxel founder, Dr. Shun-I Chu, starts the business in Taoyuan County, Taiwan in 1988. Dr. Chu rents an apartment in Taoyuan as a lab and starts to develop an analog modem in 1988
1989 – Headquarters established at Hsinchu Science Park, Taiwan in 1989
1992 – Launches world's 1st Integrated voice/fax/modem
1995 – World's 1st Analog/digital ISDN modem
2004 – World's 1st ADSL2+ gateway
2005 – World's 1st palm-sized portable personal firewall
2009 – World's 1st Gigabit active fiber & Telco-grade IPv6 end to end solution
2010 – World's 1st Carbon footprint verification on the VDSL2 CPE product
2014 – World's 1st UMTS 802.11ac compatible small cell CPE
2016 – Garners 14th Consecutive Best Taiwan Global Brands Award
2017 – Keenetic has been separated into an independent company for the SOHO and consumer markets
2019 – Zyxel Networks spun off from Zyxel Communications Corp.

Origin of name
Zyxel is pronounced “zai-cell.”

See also
 List of companies of Taiwan
 List of networking hardware vendors
 ZyNOS, an operating system used for Zyxel networking devices

References

External links
 Official site

1989 establishments in Taiwan
Manufacturing companies based in Hsinchu
Electronics companies established in 1989
Electronics companies of Taiwan
Taiwanese brands